Ghulam Pasha (born 25 November 1969) is a Pakistani former cricketer. He played eight first-class and three List A matches for several domestic teams in Pakistan between 1986 and 1990.

See also
 List of Pakistan Automobiles Corporation cricketers

References

External links
 

1969 births
Living people
Pakistani cricketers
Lahore cricketers
Pakistan Automobiles Corporation cricketers
Cricketers from Lahore